= Ogulchansky =

Ogulchánsky (pol. Ogulcansky) is a Slavic surname. It is represented in the Cyrillic alphabet as "Огульчанский".

== Origin ==
The surname Ogulchansky got its name from the word "огульный" that means "wholesale" in Russian, that says that the first representatives of this surname were merchants.

== Notable people ==
- Yuri Antonovich Ogulchansky — (1932—2007) — Ukrainian national activist and writer.
- Alexey Jakovlevich Ogulchansky — (1912—1996) — Ukrainian writer of Jewish origin and Azov explorer.
- Conan Gerasimovich Ogulchansky — Ukrainian nobleman of Polish origin.
